Asplenium  parvum is a plant in the spleenwort group of ferns. An epiphytic fern, seen growing on rocks and trees in tropical rainforests, usually at high altitude in Queensland. The specific epithet parvum is derived from latin, meaning "few or small". Described by Reverend Watts from a cultivated specimen growing in Gladesville, New South Wales. It first appeared in scientific literature in 1914 in the Linnean Society of New South Wales.

References 

parvum
Flora of Queensland
Flora of New Guinea
Ferns of Australia